Gregory W. Moeller (born March 1, 1963) is an American lawyer and judge, who is an associate justice of the Idaho Supreme Court. He previously served as an Idaho district court judge from 2009 to 2018.

Education and early career
Moeller graduated from South Fremont High School in 1981, and then attended  Brigham Young University (BYU) in Provo, Utah.  He earned a bachelor's degree, magna cum laude, in political science in 1987, and completed a J.D. degree at BYU's J. Reuben Clark Law School in 1990.

Moeller was in private practice at the law firm Rigby, Andrus & Moeller, Chtd.

Idaho state court

District Court
In 2009, Governor Butch Otter appointed Moeller as a state judge on the Idaho District Court for the 7th judicial district. He was re-elected in 2010 and 2014.

Supreme Court
In June 2018, Idaho Supreme Court justice Joel Horton announced his retirement, effective at the end of December. The Idaho Judicial Council provided Governor Butch Otter with three replacement candidates to choose from: Moeller and attorneys Rebecca Rainey and Mary York. Otter announced on November 30 that he had selected Moeller for the vacancy.

Moeller was sworn in on January 3, 2019, and ran unopposed in the 2020 election, held during the state primary in the spring..

References

1963 births
Living people
20th-century American lawyers
21st-century American judges
Idaho lawyers
Justices of the Idaho Supreme Court
Brigham Young University alumni
J. Reuben Clark Law School alumni